George Lyon may refer to:
Babe Lyon (1907–1970), American football player
George Lyon (Scottish politician) (born 1956), Scottish Liberal Democrat politician
George Lyon (Canadian politician) (1790–1851), captain in the British Army and a Canadian businessman and politician
George Lyon (golfer) (1858–1938), Canadian golfer
George Lyon, 5th Lord Glamis (died 1505)
George Lyon (highwayman) (1761–1815), Upholland highwayman
George Hamilton D'Oyly Lyon (1883–1947), cricketer, rugby union player and British Admiral
George Francis Lyon (1795–1832), Arctic and African explorer
George Ella Lyon (born 1949), American author from Kentucky

See also 
G. B. Lyon-Fellowes (1815–1876), George Byron Lyon-Fellowes, mayor of Ottawa
George Lyons (disambiguation)